Operation Anaconda  was a military operation that took place in early March 2002 as part of the War in Afghanistan. CIA paramilitary officers, working with their allies, attempted to destroy al-Qaeda and Taliban forces.  The operation took place in the Shahi-Kot Valley and Arma Mountains southeast of Zormat. This operation was the first large-scale battle in the post-2001 War in Afghanistan since the Battle of Tora Bora in December 2001. This was the first operation in the Afghanistan theater to involve a large number of U.S. forces participating in direct combat activities.

Between March 2 and March 16, 2002 1,700 airlifted U.S. troops and 1,000 pro-government Afghan militia battled between 300 and 1,000 al-Qaeda and Taliban fighters to obtain control of the valley. The Taliban and al-Qaeda forces fired mortars and heavy machine guns from entrenched positions in the caves and ridges of the mountainous terrain at U.S. forces attempting to secure the area. Afghan Taliban commander Maulavi Saif-ur-Rehman Mansoor later led Taliban reinforcements to join the battle. U.S. forces had estimated the strength of the rebels in the Shahi-Kot Valley at 150 to 200, but later information suggested the actual strength was of 500 to 1,000 fighters. The U.S. forces estimated they had killed at least 500 fighters over the duration of the battle, however journalists later noted that only 23 bodies were found – and critics suggested that after a couple days, the operation "was more driven by media obsession, than military necessity".

Background
The Shahi-Kot (which translates as the 'Place of the King') stretches 9 km in length and 5 km across at its widest point. It is composed of two distinct areas, the Lower and Upper Shahi-Kot which run roughly parallel to each other. In the Lower Shahikot several imposing mountains dominate the landscape; chief among them is Takur Ghar at the southeastern end of the valley; to the northeast is Tsapare Ghar, dominating the northern entrance to the valley. During the Soviet–Afghan War, Mujahideen leader Malawi Nasrullah Mansoor was in charge of the valley and invited foreign jihadists to base themselves in the Lower Shahikot. Mansoor fortified the valley, digging trench systems, building bunkers and firing positions into the ridgelines, many of which would be put to effect during the operation. Malawi Nasrullah Mansoor later joined the Taliban, becoming governor of Paktia Province before being killed in a battle with a rival warlord. Using his family's connections in the region Nasrullah Mansoor's son, Saif-ur-Rehman Mansoor, became the leading Taliban commander of Zurmat District in Paktia Province by 2002.

In February 2002, a Special Forces intelligence analyst working for Task Force Bowie began to identify patterns that led him to believe that surviving al-Qaeda forces were massing in the Lower Shahikot Valley, some 60 miles south of Gardez. The Lower Shahikot bordered the Pakistani tribal lands where many al-Qaeda fighters were believed to have escaped to from Tora Bora. Others within AFO and the CIA were making the same connection. Increasing signals and human intelligence indicated a strong presence of Taliban and al-Qaeda fighters in the Shahi-Kot Valley; approximately 150 to 200 fighters were believed to be wintering and possibly preparing for a spring offensive in the valley. The signal intelligence also raised the possibility that high-value targets (HVTs) were present in the valley among which were Jalaluddin Haqqani and Saif Rahman. In late January and February plans were drawn up to assault the Shahi-Kot Valley using Afghan military forces (AMF) advised and assisted by U.S. special operators. Major General Franklin L. Hagenbeck, Commander, Combined Joint Task Force Mountain, was put in command of the operation. The plan called for an attack on the valley, along with units positioned in the mountains to the east to prevent escape into Pakistan.  The expectation was that fighters, as in the case of Tora Bora several months earlier, would flee in the face of an assault and that blocker groups would simply be able to round them up.

It was decided to use U.S. conventional infantry. The forces used, consisting of the 187th Infantry Regiment ("Rakkasans") of the 101st Airborne Division, led by Colonel Frank Wiercinski, and soldiers of 1st Battalion, 87th Infantry Regiment, 10th Mountain Division, led by Lieutenant Colonel Paul LaCamera, were to be inserted by CH-47D Chinooks, supported by 6 AH-64A Apache helicopters and secure these blocking positions. In keeping with established strategy in Afghanistan, fire support was to be provided by United States Air Force units, rather than artillery. Further air support was provided by U.S. Navy units and French Air Force Mirage 2000Ds. The amount of conventional assets allowed in Afghanistan was limited by United States Central Command (CENTCOM) and civilian defense leadership. The final plan foresaw two major forces: TF Hammer and TF Anvil. TF Hammer consisted of AMF and special operators as the primary effort to assault the Shahi-Kot Valley; their objective was to enter the valley from the north, assaulting through the villages of Serkhankheyl and Marzak, where intelligence indicated that the enemy was concentrated, and channel fleeing enemy into the TF Rakkasan blocking positions. TF Anvil consisted of TF Rakkasan and the 1-87 to set up blocking positions and prevent enemy forces from escaping. Special operations teams from the AFO detachment led by Lieutenant Colonel Pete Blaber were to provide on-location reconnaissance in the Shahi-Kot Valley for the operation.

The Afghans had successfully defeated the Soviet Army twice in this valley, and were expecting events to pan out in a similar fashion.

Prelude

The operation was composed of elements: Task Force Dagger: ODAs from the 5th SFG, B company, 2nd Battalion, 160th SOAR and USAF Combat Controllers. AMF (Afghan Militia Forces): Commander Zia (Task Force Hammer), Kamil Khan and Zakim Khan (Task Force Anvil). Task Force Rakkasan: 3rd Brigade, 101st Airborne Division, 1st and 2nd battalion 187th Infantry Regiment, 1st Battalion, 87th Infantry Regiment, 10th Mountain Division. Task Force Commando: 2nd Brigade, 10th Mountain Division, 4th Battalion, 31st Infantry Regiment 3rd Battalion, Princess Patricia's Canadian Light Infantry. Task Force 64: 1 Squadron, Australian Special Air Service Regiment. Task Force K-Bar: ODAs from the 3rd SFG. Task Force Bowie: AFO (made up of a 45-man reconnaissance unit Delta Force and augmented by selected DEVGRU operators recce specialists, combat controllers and supported by ISA's technical experts, AFO conducted covert reconnaissance usually sending small 2 or 3 man teams on foot or on ATVs, deploying observation posts to watch and report enemy movements and numbers as well as environmental reconnaissance). Task Force Sword/11: Mako 30, 31 and 21, Task Force Blue/DEVGRU.

SOF teams from Task Force K-Bar and Task Force 64, which included: Navy SEALs from SEAL Teams 2, 3 and 8, Green Berets from 3rd SFG, The Canadian Army's Joint Task Force 2 (JTF2), The German Army's Kommando Spezialkräfte (KSK), the Norwegian special forces units Forsvarets Spesialkommando (FSK) and Marinejegerkommandoen (MJK), elements of the Australian Special Air Service Regiment and the New Zealand Special Air Service and the Danish special forces from Jægerkorpset. these teams inserted into the outer edges of the valley to cut off any escape.

Other units that took part are the B Co. 159th Avn Rgt, 75th Ranger Regiment, Joint Special Operations Command and CIA's Special Activities Division and British Royal Marines.

In the planning phase of the operation, the commander of Delta Force, LTC Pete Blaber ruled out any helicopter infiltration of AFOs into the area as not to alert the terrorists in the valley; in addition to AFOs conducting reconnaissance of routes into and around the valley on modified Polaris ATVs (often in adverse weather conditions on difficult terrain), two teams (codenamed India and Juliet) with 3 and 5 operators (respectively) of highly experienced Delta operators from their squadrons Reconnaissance and Surveillance Troop and elite Air Force combat controllers from the 24th STS climbed high into the mountains and gorges of the Shahikot, often in extreme weather conditions, to conduct environmental reconnaissance. Their vital intelligence was fed back to the AFO and would prove invaluable once the operation started. On February 28, on the eve of the operation, three AFO teams were covertly infiltrated into the valley, one codenamed Juliet was made up of 5 Delta operators, a combat controller, and a signals intelligence specialist from the ISA, entered the valley on ATVs from the north, driving through the night in adverse weather conditions, eventually reaching a covert hide on the eastern side of the valley. Another team codenamed India, composed of three Delta operators, a combat controller and an attached ISA operator walked into the valley through the same conditions to a hide in the southwest of the valley, known as the "Fish Hook".  The final team was known as Mako 31 and was composed of three SEALs from DEVGRUs Red Team, a USAF Combat Controller and a US Navy EOD operator. They infiltrated the area on foot via the southern edge of the valley to set up an observation post on a terrain feature known as 'The Finger.' All three teams were tasked with confirming enemy strengths and dispositions including antiaircraft emplacements, ensuring the designated Rakkasan HLZs were clear of obstructions and providing terminal guidance for air support both prior to and during the insertion of conventional forces. SOF teams from Task Force K-Bar and Task Force 64 also inserted into the valley to establish observation posts which according to US planners "had to be tenable, afford good reconnaissance, and cover the identified escape routes or 'rat lines' into Pakistan"

Battle

1 March 2002
Near H-Hour, Mako 31 found a group of foreign fighters that had established a position and were manning a DShK HMG on the peak where they planned to set up an observation post. If the DShK was not disabled before then it could shootdown Chinooks carrying the conventional forces, the SEALs planned to ambush the enemy in the pre-dawn darkness before the Rakkasans flew into the valley. However they were spotted by an Uzbek insurgent and a brief firefight ensued, killing 5 out of 7 foreign fighters, as another insurgent joined the firefight by firing a PKM, the team broke contact and brought in an AC-130 which destroyed the enemy encampment with 105mm rounds.

2 March 2002
Canadian and U.S. sniper teams and Afghan forces begin to sweep the Shahi-Kot valley area to root out rebel forces regrouping in the valley after the fall of the Taliban regime.

TF Hammer/TF Anvil

TF Hammer consisted of a large force of Afghan militia led by Zia Lodin and the Special Forces A-teams Texas 14/ODA 594 and Cobra 72/ODA 372. The road was in poor condition and difficulties ensued. Several soldiers were injured after their jingle trucks overturned, the commanders ordered the trucks to use their headlights, destroying any element of surprise. As TF Hammer continued, it suffered from a lack of unit cohesion because of the transportation difficulties. A convoy led by Army Chief Warrant Officer Stanley L. Harriman of the Third Special Forces Group split off from the main TF Hammer force to reach the assigned observation point. Grim 31, an AC-130 aircraft providing fire support and reconnaissance for the assault, spotted Harriman's convoy and, due to a failure in its inertial navigation system, believed it was in a position away from friendly forces (this was due to a problem with the "glint" panels which should have identified the convoy as American). Grim 31 engaged the column, resulting in the death of Harriman and wounding several Afghan militia and U.S. special forces.

The main body of TF Hammer reached its pre-assault point around 06:15 and waited for the expected "55 minute" aerial bombardment of enemy positions. Miscommunication between Texas 14 and higher command meant the bombardment was not that extensive and consisted of six bombs. This was due to a bomb getting stuck in the launch bay of the B-1B that was on its bomb run. The next aircraft in line waited for the B-1B to receive permission to jettison the bomb and go round again. During this time, both bombers plus the additional two F-15Es claimed to have received a "knock off" call directing them to cease the bombardment. One of the F-15E pilots later acknowledged that this may have been a communication directing Grim-31 to cease fire. This lack of air support demoralized the Afghans and frustrated the special forces. The Afghan fighters, in trucks, were devastated by mortar fire registered in advance to strike fixed points on the road. The Afghans suffered forty or more deaths and injuries. At this point it became clear that Al Qaeda fighters had been expecting an attack.  TF Hammer's attack stalled short of entering the valley, due to unexpected heavy small arms and mortar fire, combined with the lack of expected close air support. These assets were tasked instead to the TF Anvil troops.

TF Rakkasan

At 06:30 the first wave of Rakkasans and Mountain troops landed via Chinook helicopter along the eastern and northern edges of the valley to await the fleeing fighters at their assigned blocking positions. The terrorists appeared surprised and did not fire on the Chinooks, its possible that they were distracted by TF Hammer's advance or the ineffective communication between the foreign fighters themselves. The first shots rung out the infantry took up security positions around the HLZ as the Chinooks lifted off and departed. They came under fire almost immediately after landing on their way to their objectives, and remained pinned down by heavy mortar fire and locked in a fierce firefight throughout the day. Orbiting Apache helicopters attempted to suppress enemy mortar teams, but ran into a wall of RPG and 12.7mm fire, with one Apache losing all of its electronics to an RPG hit. Instead of 150-200 fighters in the valley as expected, post assessment held that the area contained 750 to 1,000 terrorists dug in on the high ground around the valley. The insurgents used their ZPU-1 antiaircraft guns, DSHK and small arms fire against the attack helicopters supporting the Rakkasans. 

The troops of the 1st Battalion, 87th Infantry Regiment in the southern landing zones (LZs) faced the heaviest fighting. The men on the floor of the valley then picked up and began to patrol north again moving another 50 or so meters when an RPG was fired off a low foothill to the east.  This round closed in on around 10 men, including the two Australians and most of the American leadership, landing in the snow and mud right amongst them but failing to detonate.  The AQ then opened up with a DShK as the troops on the ground ran for the only cover on the valley floor in what became known as "Hell's Halfpipe."  The hot reception resulted in only two of the planned eight CH-47's landing in the LZ.  In this engagement, Staff Sergeant Andrzej Ropel, and Specialist William Geraci, recently transferred in from the Division's Long Range Surveillance Detachment, led the squad under fire to a ridgeline above the "Halfpipe."  Ropel was able to kill the enemy observer calling mortar fire into the "Halfpipe," and he and his squad could now see the surrounding terrain. Ropel was later awarded the Bronze Star Medal with a Valor device for his actions. The expectation of very limited enemy indirect fire capability meant that only a single 120mm mortar was brought in the first wave. The primary fire support for the troops was provided by two McDonnell Douglas AH-64 Apaches of the 3rd Battalion, 101st Aviation Regiment, 159th Aviation Brigade ("Eagle Attack"). The Apaches destroyed some enemy positions harassing the U.S. and Afghan troops, but the insurgents began intentionally firing their RPGs into the air. The rockets would automatically detonate at 920 meters, catching helicopters in flak bursts (a tactic learned in the Soviet-Afghan War). The two Apaches were damaged early on in the day, one Apache was forced to return to base when an RPG destroyed its left-side Hellfire mount sending shrapnel through the airframe; as well as being peppered by small arms, further RPG rounds and DShK rounds (one DShK round penetrated the cockpit narrowly missing the pilots).

Despite heavy opposition, Task Force Rakkasan managed to secure its blocking positions to the north by the middle of the morning. TF Rakkasan and TF Hammer fought all day with the AFO teams calling in continuous airstrikes on al-Qaeda positions while Apaches protected the Rakkasans on the valley floor. AFO's only frustration was that Rakkasan ETAC/JTAC had priority for calling in airstrikes over the AFOs requests and the other SOF reconnaissance teams in and around the valley. Signalman Martin "Jock" Wallace, of the Australian Special Air Service Regiment, was awarded the Medal for Gallantry for his actions during the fighting. When a mortar team from the 1-87 Infantry was hit by enemy mortar fire, Wallace put himself in harm's way, collecting some of the wounded by dragging them into the creek bed, then dressing their wounds along with another SASR liaison officer. Throughout the day, the TACP forward air controllers and Special Forces teams that had infiltrated into the area the previous day assisted in calling in airstrikes from B-1, B-52, F-15, F-18 and F-16 aircraft, inflicting heavy casualties on the Taliban and al Qaeda fighters, but by no means silencing them.  After nearly having their position overrun, the men in the southern LZs were in a desperate position, pinned down all day and short of ammunition.  Salvation came after dark in the form of an AC-130U Spooky gunship that unlike the faster-moving jets during the day, was able to loiter over the area and provide sustained firepower so the men could be airlifted out under cover of darkness; the group suffered 35 wounded (two chalks of which were casevaced by PaveHawk CSAR choppers) and none killed.

3 March and 4 March 2002

Battle of Takur Ghar

In the late evening of 3 March, Lieutenant Colonel Pete Blaber received notice from Brigadier General Gregory Trebon, commander of TF 11, that two SEAL fire teams commanded by Lieutenant Commander Vic Hyder were to be inserted into the Shahi-Kot Valley. The two SEAL fire teams, Mako 30 and Mako 21, planned to establish an observation point on either end of the valley. One team would move to the peak of Takur Ghar, which commanded the southern approach to the Shahi-Kot valley. Due to time constraints, a helicopter insertion would be needed for the teams to reach the peak before dawn. LCDR Hyder requested authorization to shift the insertion 24 hours to the next evening but was directed that insertion was critical to SOF providing support to the Operation. Even though all overhead imagery showed no signs of life on the peak of Takur Ghar, LCDR Hyder gave the team final guidance per SOP that if any signs were seen, mission would be aborted.

The SEAL fire team, Mako 30, was picked up by an MH-47 Chinook helicopter, at 23:23 on 3 March. However, the Chinook experienced engine difficulties, and new MH-47s were dispatched to replace the original helicopters. This delay meant that the SEALs could not be inserted into the LZ east of the peak until 02:30 on 4 March, which did not allow enough time to reach the peak before daylight. Blaber was notified that the SEALs were forced to insert on the peak in order to fulfill the order to infil Mako 30 that night. Nail 22, an AC-130H Spectre, reconnoitered the peak, and, seeing no enemy activity, declared the mountain top secure. It was then called away to support other troops before the Chinook arrived.

At approximately 03:00, the Chinook attempted to land atop the mountain. As they approached, the pilots and SEALs observed tracks in the snow and other signs of recent human activity. As they discussed a possible mission abort, the helicopter was met with effective RPG fire.  Two Rocket Propelled Grenades slammed into the helicopter, shutting down one of its engines, the electric system, and the hydraulic systems and causing Petty Officer First Class Neil C. Roberts to fall out of the open ramp. Razor 03 attempted to return and retrieve him, but the damage prevented proper control and the helicopter was forced to crash-land in the valley below, approximately 4 miles away. Razor 04 returned to the peak in an attempt to rescue Roberts, offloading Mako 30. The team came under immediate fire, and Air Force combat controller Technical Sergeant John A. Chapman was seriously injured, along with two Navy SEALs. Mako 30 was forced off the peak due to the heavy fire and damage done. The Ranger quick-reaction force located at Bagram Air Base and led by Captain Nate Self, was called in to search for the SEAL who fell out of the helicopter, now alone on top of the mountain.

Around this time command decided to change the frequencies for satellite radio communications which different units, including the AFO teams in their reconnaissance positions, were relying on to conduct and adapt the mission as the battle unfolded. One of the generals in overall charge of the events at Takur Ghar ordered the radio frequencies switched to prevent the plan being modified.  Though the change may have been meant to enhance direct control of the rescue of the downed SEAL atop Takur Ghar, it had the critical effect of severely limiting communications between the different teams participating in the battle.

The SEAL team Mako 30, regrouped and was ferried by nearby units to a CH-47 to go back to Takur Ghar and search for Roberts. The AC-130 was then directed to attack the large groupings of enemy combatants currently exposed on top of the mountain, one to three minutes before the Mako 30 was scheduled to arrive. As the CH-47 neared their return, the AC-130 radioed on the new satellite frequency for confirmation to fire. They were unable to get a clear answer from the officer they reached and also were unable to connect with the AFO teams. As a result, they did not fire and the CH-47 made an entry similar to the first, this time successfully landing the team on the ground amidst heavy machine gun and rocket fire while taking some casualties. They were able to establish communications via a line-of-sight radio with the teams of the AFO positioned around the Takur Ghar, taking advantage of the AFO's knowledge of enemy movements in real time.

At 03:45, the Ranger quick reaction force was alerted by the DCG to the area. Though they weren't given a specific mission, they were to establish communication for further instructions upon reaching Gardez, 10 minutes from the mountain. The quick reaction force (QRF) consisted of 19 Rangers, a Tactical Air Control Party (Tacp), and a three-man USAF special tactics team carried by two Chinooks, Razor 01 and Razor 02. As Air Force rules prohibited AC-130 aircraft from remaining in hostile airspace in daylight after the crash of an AC-130 in Khafji in the Gulf War, the AC-130 support protecting Mako 30 was forced to leave before Razor 01 reached the LZ, although the leadership was aware that Razor 01 was incoming. Unfortunately, the Razor Chinooks had not been equipped with functioning satellite radios to maintain communication with the HQ in Bagram or, even more critically, the AFO Teams lead. Also, unfortunately, the pilot of the Razor 01 was not told about the enemy's anti-aircraft location on top of the mountain. Because of this, the Razor 01 flew into the same enemy trap that the SEALs had flown into, with no one able to communicate the reality of the situation.

At approximately 06:10, Razor 01 reached the landing zone. The aircraft immediately began taking fire, and the right door minigunner, Sergeant Phillip Svitak, was killed by small arms fire. Drone footage of the incident shows the mortally wounded Technical Sergeant John A. Chapman drawing fire away from Razor 01 as it landed. This action earned him the Congressional Medal of Honor. A rocket-propelled grenade then hit the helicopter, destroying the right engine and forcing it to crash land. As the Rangers and special tactics team exited the aircraft, Private First Class Matt Commons, posthumously promoted to Corporal, Sergeant Brad Crose, and Specialist Marc Anderson were killed. The surviving crew and quick-reaction force took cover in a hillock and a fierce firefight began. Razor 02, which had been diverted to Gardez as Razor 01 was landing on Takur Ghar, returned with the rest of the quick-reaction force and Lieutenant Commander Hyder at 06:25. With the help of the new arrivals and close air support, the force was able to consolidate its position on the peak. The QRF's Chalk 2 moved up the mountain to assist Chalk 1. Hyder saw the need to assist Mako 21 who at that time had two dead and two injured, one of them non-ambulatory. It was obvious from this viewpoint that the proximity of friendly forces to the enemy positions was preventing sufficient suppressive firepower from being used due to danger close distance to both Mako 30 and QRF chalk 1. Hyder directed the Chalk 2 leader to continue mission up the mountain and moved, alone, to link up with Mako 21 in order to assist that team's movement away from the peak thereby creating a better situation for air assets to support by fire. An enemy counterattack midday mortally wounded Senior Airman Jason D. Cunningham, a pararescueman. The wounded were refused medevac during the daylight hours, due to risk of another downed helicopter. Mako 30 and Lt. Cmdr. Hyder moved down the mountain with their wounded. Through threat of nearby enemy response elements, hypothermia and shock of wounded personnel, and across nearly 30" of snow in extreme terrain, Mako 21 found a site suitable for an MH-47. The SEAL team set up defenses, attempted to warm the wounded, and waited for dark when a recovery would be attempted.

Australian SASR soldiers inserted with a USAF Combat Controller had infiltrated the area prior to the first helicopter crash undetected as part of a long range reconnaissance mission when the Chinooks went down. They remained undetected in an observation post through the firefight and proved critical in co-ordinating multiple Coalition air strikes to prevent the al-Qaeda fighters from overrunning the downed aircraft, to devastating effect. This, plus the actions of the two SASR officers working with the 10th Mountain Division, earned the commander of the Australian SASR force in Afghanistan the US Bronze Star for his unit's outstanding contribution to the war on terrorism. Australian soldiers had utilised 'virtual reality' style software for mission rehearsal prior to insertion, and this contributed significantly to their situational awareness in the darkness and poor weather conditions. This was the first time this capability had been used for a live combat mission.

At around 20:00, the quick-reaction force and Mako 30/21 were exfiltrated from the Takur Ghar peak. As a result of this action, both Technical Sergeant Chapman and Senior Airman Cunningham were awarded the Air Force Cross, the second highest award for bravery. US and Afghan sources believe at least 200 Taliban and Al Qaida fighters were killed during the initial assault and subsequent rescue mission.

Also on March 4, 2nd Battalion of the Rakkasans air assaulted into the eastern end of the valley, immediately attacking the heights under Apache cover. Meanwhile, the 3rd battalion were dropped into the northern end of the valley with the objective of linking up with the stranded forces at the blocking positions. Supported by 16 Apaches, 5 USMC Cobras helicopters and several A-10A ground attack aircraft; the Rakkasans methodically cleared an estimated 130 caves, 22 bunkers and 40 buildings to finally secure the valley.

Fate of Roberts
It is not certain whether the sailor died immediately or was killed by opposing soldiers. There is a possibility that Roberts was captured by the al Qaeda fighters, and executed later with a single shot to the back of the head (One of the feeds showed a group of 8-10 fighters huddling around what appeared to be a body; both GRIM 32 and MAKO 30 noted that an IR strobe was active, a video feed showed the fighters passing the IR strobe around). This report has not been confirmed. Maj. Gen. Frank Hagenbeck did confirm that al-Qaeda fighters were seen (on live video feed from a Predator drone orbiting the firefight) chasing Roberts, and later dragging his body away from the spot where he fell. Another feed from the same Predator showed a puff of heat [from a rifle] and the indistinct figure in front of it fall. Also, the quick-reaction soldiers reported fighters wearing Robert's gear and finding "a helmet with a bullet hole in it, [from which] it was clear the last person [Roberts] to wear it had been shot in the head." Predator drone footage also shows the possibility that TSgt. John Chapman was alive and fighting on the peak after the SEALs left rather than being killed outright as thought by Mako 30. Chapman was seen fighting in a bunker against multiple enemies before stepping into the open and braving enemy small arms fire one last time to allow the QRF helicopter a bit of breathing room.

A paper written by Col. Andrew Milani (Former commander of the 160th Special Operations Aviation Regiment) and Dr. Stephen D. Biddle entitled "Pitfalls of Technology: A Case Study of the battle of Takur Ghar" noted that the Predator was on station 90 minutes after Roberts had fallen; the images that were shot before the Predator had arrived were shot by GRIM-32's Infrared Cameras. although this has not been confirmed by commanders.

10 March 2002
Major Bryan Hilferty states that the "major battle ended three or four days ago." The U.S. sends 400 of its troops back to base.

12 March 2002
The exhausted Rakkasans were replaced by fresh elements from the 10th Mountain Division, who continued to clear the southern end of the Shahikot. AFO teams launched further Recce teams into the nearby Naka Valley, hunting for al-Qaeda terrorists that had escaped but did not find anything. By this day, following heavy bombing by U.S. strike fighter aircraft, joint U.S. and Afghan forces swept through the valley and cleared it of remaining rebel forces, with little significant combat by 18 March. A total of 8 U.S. soldiers, sailors, and airmen were killed and 82 wounded, along with several Afghan militiamen; U.S. estimates of other casualties vary, indicating rebel casualties between 500 and 800 and at least 14 civilian casualties. An undetermined number of rebels are said to have escaped the fighting through rugged terrain.

17 March 2002
Task Force 11 received time-sensitive intelligence that a possible HVT was travelling within a convoy of al-Qaeda fighters who were attempting to escape by vehicle from Shahikot into Pakistan. A Predator UAV had the convoy under surveillance, showing 3 SUVs, a pickup truck and a large security element of gunmen. The TF 11 element assigned to the mission included SEAL operators from DEVGRU (commanded by the SEAL who led the Mako 30 mission on Takur Ghar) and attached British SBS operators, with a mixed force of Rangers as back up. The operators and an assigned CSAR team boarded 3 MH-47Es while the Rangers climbed aboard a pair of MH-60G Blackhawks, launching from Bagram in the early morning. The MH-47Es carrying the SEALs caught up to their targets: the lead Chinook landed in front of the convoy; as the occupants leapt out of their vehicles, the door gunner hosed the vehicles down with his minigun, cutting down a number of al-Qaeda terrorists; the second Chinook overshot the column and raked it with minigun fire as it passed. The TF 11 operators added their firepower. Two Chinooks then landed their passengers in cover nearby and the operators took up positions overlooking the convoy. Both teams of SEAL operators now opened fire down on the enemy fighters in a crossfire and the third Chinook landed its operators nearby to investigate a suspicious looking vehicle. The firefight was over in minutes; of the 18 al-Qaeda fighters, 16 were killed and two were wounded. The fighters were a mix of well equipped Uzbeks, Chechens, and Afghan Arabs. The operators recovered a lot of US military equipment: a US-made suppressor, a number of US fragmentation grenades issued to TF 11 and a Garmin handheld GPS, later traced to the crew of Razor 01.

18 March 2002
General Tommy Franks declares Operation Anaconda over, later describing it "an unqualified and complete success." Investigative reporter Seymour Hersh refuted the official account, describing it as "in fact a debacle, plagued by squabbling between the services, bad military planning and avoidable deaths of American soldiers, as well as the escape of key al-Qaeda leaders, likely including Osama bin Laden."

Assessment

The operation ran into problems from the outset. American Forces mistakenly landed in the middle of the valley, instead of the outside and were immediately caught in the Taliban's kill zone. In the heavy fire fight that followed two Chinooks were shot down and a number of others were severely damaged. American forces eventually gained the upper hand, inflicting heavy casualties on the Taliban forces and pushing them out of the valley.

At the end of Operation Anaconda, the US and Afghan forces had succeeded at removing the majority of the Al-Qaeda and Taliban presence from the Shahi-Kot Valley. The US forces suffered 80 casualties in the operation, with 8 killed and 72 wounded. An undetermined number of Afghan fighters were also killed in the Operation Anaconda. Estimates of Al-Qaeda and Taliban casualties range from 100 to 1,000, with U.S. commanders favoring the higher estimates and Afghan commanders favoring the lower estimates.

Security expert Bill Roggio argued that al-Qaeda "took a beating during the battle, [but] they were by no means defeated".

In the wake of Operation Anaconda, relations between US and UK forces on the ground soured when Stars and Stripes, the magazine for American forces and their families, openly criticized the Royal Marines for returning "empty-handed" from their search for al-Qaeda and Taliban fighters claiming that Britain's contribution to the campaign was "disappointing." Relations were further soured with reports from a number of publications that Osama bin Laden might have escaped due to a substantial delay from the original H-hour of the deployment of American Forces.

Stephen Biddle has characterized Operation Anaconda as a "series of surprisingly orthodox ground battles." He rejects the popular characterization of the operation as a guerilla war.

Long-distance sniper record
The record for the longest combat kill by a sniper was set during Operation Anaconda by Canadian Army sniper Corporal Rob Furlong of the 3rd Battalion Princess Patricia's Canadian Light Infantry and held for seven years until surpassed in 2009. Using a McMillan TAC-50 .50-calibre rifle, Furlong killed a Taliban fighter armed with an RPK machine gun at a confirmed distance of 2,430 metres (1.51 miles).

The five-man team, including MCpl Graham Ragsdale, MCpl Tim McMeekin, MCpl Arron Perry, Cpl Dennis Eason, and Cpl Rob Furlong, killed over 20 enemy fighters during the operation and were awarded Bronze Star medals by the United States for their service.

Reverse side of the operation
Operation Anaconda was also met with criticism. According to an interview of some soldiers of the German Special Forces KSK, the post-operation briefing was broken down by an argument between the KSK soldiers and U.S. soldiers. The cause of the conflict is said to have been the complaint of some U.S. soldiers that the KSK soldiers had only changed their position when a shepherd stumbled into their hideout instead of killing him. "Use your silenced gun, then move on."

"The U.S. soldiers would in fact eliminate such 'threats,' says a former KSK officer. (...) The Germans are quoted to have witnessed U.S. Forces flattening entire villages during Operation Anaconda: 'Let's go, free to pillage' (...). A former KSK commander is quoted in the German magazine Stern to have said: 'The pictures of Abu Ghraib, the torture in Iraqi prison camps, did absolutely not surprise me.'''

Aftermath
By July the tactical-level units from the 10th Mountain Division and the 101st Airborne Division, including TF Rakkasan, had all
departed Afghanistan; the CTF Mountain headquarters staff followed in early September. They were replaced by CTF 82, formed from the headquarters of the 82d Airborne Division and led by the division's commander, Major General John R. Vines. CTF 82's headquarters was at Bagram Airfield, and Vines based TF Panther, his primary maneuver element, at the Kandahar Airfield. TF Panther was under the command of Colonel James L. Huggins and had two infantry battalions from the 3d Brigade of the 82d Airborne Division and one attached infantry battalion from the division's 1st Brigade. Huggins also had support from artillery, aviation, military intelligence, and other units. TF Panther deployed to Afghanistan in late June 2002 and would serve under CTF 82 until 5 December 2002. At that point TF Devil, a unit formed around the 1st Brigade, 82d Airborne Division arrived to take the lead in tactical-level security operations.

The Taliban subsequently portrayed the operation as a "historical battle" and a "beginning of the sacred jihad against the occupation of Afghanistan", praising Saifur Rehman Mansoor's leadership. The battle and Mansoor (who was killed in 2008) were eulogized by the Taliban's official website, Voice of Jihad, on 7 March 2021.

See also
War in Afghanistan
Mountain warfare
Special Activities Division
Timeline of the history of Afghanistan

Notes

Further reading
 Bahmanyar, Mir.  Afghanistan Cave Complexes 1979–2004: Mountain strongholds of the Mujahideen, Taliban & Al Qaeda.  Osprey Publishing, 2004.
 Bahmanyar, Mir. Shadow Warriors:  A History of the US Army Rangers. Osprey Publishing, 2005.
 Bahmanyar, Mir. US Army Ranger 1983-2002. Osprey Publishing, 2003.
 Blaber, Pete. "The Mission the Men and Me: Lessons from a Former Delta Force Commander" US Army Colonel, Retired 2006. Executive Director Global Commercial Operations Amgen
 Friedman, Brandon. 2007. The War I Always Wanted: The Illusion of Glory and the Reality of War: A Screaming Eagle in Afghanistan and Iraq,  Zenith Press, 
 Grau, Lester W. and Dodge Billingsley. Operation Anaconda: America's First Major Battle in Afghanistan. Lawrence: University Press of Kansas, 2011. 
 Hersh, Seymour,  Chain of Command, The Road from 911 to Abu Ghraib, Harper Collins, 2004
 MacPherson, M. 2005. Roberts Ridge : A Story of Courage and Sacrifice on Takur Ghar Mountain, Afghanistan'', Delacorte, 
 
 Naylor, Sean. Not a Good Day to Die, Berkley Reprint,

External links

The U.S. Army in Afghanistan Operation ENDURING FREEDOM October 2001 - March 2002
 Defense and National Security Studies  
 Combat Films and Research
 https://web.archive.org/web/20040728014146/http://www.stripesonline.com/
 BBC News: Al Qaeda 'executed US serviceman'
 Strategypage interview of Col. Wiercinski
 Executive Summary of the Battle of Takur Ghar (pdf)
 VFW Magazine: Valor in the Face of the Enemy - Air Force Cross awarded to Senior Airman Jason Dean Cunningham and Tech. Sgt. John Chapman

2002 in Afghanistan
Afghanistan conflict (1978–present)
Battles of the War in Afghanistan (2001–2021)
Battles of the War in Afghanistan (2001–2021) involving Australia
Battles of the War in Afghanistan (2001–2021) involving Canada
Battles of the War in Afghanistan (2001–2021) involving France
Battles of the War in Afghanistan (2001–2021) involving Germany
Battles of the War in Afghanistan (2001–2021) involving New Zealand
Battles of the War in Afghanistan (2001–2021) involving Norway
Military operations of the War in Afghanistan (2001–2021) involving the United Kingdom
Battles of the War in Afghanistan (2001–2021) involving the United States
Conflicts in 2002
History of Paktia Province
Military operations of the War in Afghanistan (2001–2021) involving Australia
Operations involving American special forces
United States Army Rangers
Wars involving the Taliban
March 2002 events in Asia